Paatti Sollai Thattathe is a 1988 Indian Tamil-language comedy film, directed by Rajasekhar and produced by AVM Productions. The film stars Pandiarajan, Urvashi and Manorama. It was released on 22 July 1988 and became a silver jubilee success. The film was remade in Telugu by the same studio as Bamma Maata Bangaru Baata (1990).

Plot 

Kannathaa, an old rich countrywoman of character, as well as her husband, Vadjiran Subbaiya, an old hunter, look forward to the return of Selvam, their unique grandson, whom they raised with love, since the death of his parents. Selvam returns at his home, having ended his high studies. In the train which returns him, he meets Seetha, also a graduate, who avoids her home, because of a marriage forced with a notorious procurer. Because he knows how to marry not with the one who was intended he and chosen by the good care of his grandmother, Selvam exiles himself with Seetha, who has just married him, towards the capital.

The couple meets difficult debuts, because they are obliged to work in the same office, by pretending not to know each other. They have to face a multitude of qui pro quos. Then once reconciled with his grandmother, Selvam and Seetha is obliged to lie him, by presenting him a child who is not theirs. Indeed, Vadjiran Subbaiya who had come see his grandson, well before, leaves Seetha with a child in her arms. The old man deduced that it was theirs. Selvam "thus" "rented", with Anushya, her baby, to keep up appearances. But the young woman turns out to be a big swindler. She exploits the situation of the couple.

Cast 
Manorama as Kannathaa
Pandiarajan as Selvam
Urvashi as Seetha
Silk Smitha as Anushya
Disco Shanti as
Kovai Sarala as Leela
S. S. Chandran as Vadjiran Subbaiya
Y. G. Mahendran as Criminal lawyer Kid
 Senthil as the sub-inspector
 Anandaraj as the auto-rickshaw driver
Vennira Aadai Moorthy as Civil lawyer Moorthy

Production 

M. Saravanan who initially worked as production manager produced his first film Mamiyar Mechina Marumagal (1959). The film's failure left him upset and he decided to score a successful film in near future on the same subject which eventually became Paatti Sollai Thattathe. The makers initially wanted Gangai Amaran to direct the film which did not work out. Saravanan decided to adapt Pattam Parakudhu written by Chitralaya Gopu after it was rejected by television channels. Pattam Parakudhu was adapted from the 1968 American film The Love Bug. The film featured a Volkswagen Beetle named "Super Car" that was inspired by Herbie, the car featured in The Love Bug.

Soundtrack 
The soundtrack was composed by Chandrabose, with lyrics written by Vairamuthu.

Release and reception 
Paatti Sollai Thattathe was released on 22 July 1988, and became a commercial success, celebrating silver jubilee. The car sequence was well received, and brought repeat audiences to theatres. The Indian Express wrote, "While Gopu shows much eagerness to indulge in some naughty lines [..] director Rajasekhar [..] shows thoughtfulness in fashioning his sequences". Jeyamanmadhan of Kalki said the film was only worth watching for Manorama. Manorama won the Cinema Express Award for Best Comedy Actress, and B. Nagarajan won the Tamil Nadu State Film Award for Best Art Director. The film was remade by AVM in Telugu as Bamma Maata Bangaru Baata (1990).

References

Bibliography

External links 
 

1980s Tamil-language films
1988 comedy films
1988 films
AVM Productions films
Films directed by Rajasekhar (director)
Films scored by Chandrabose (composer)
Indian comedy films
Tamil films remade in other languages